Neoplasticism, known in Dutch as Nieuwe Beelding or the new image, is an avant-garde art theory that arose in 1917 and was employed mainly by Dutch De Stijl artists. The most notable advocates of the theory were the painters Theo van Doesburg and Piet Mondriaan. Neoplasticism advocated for an abstract art that had been purified by applying the most elementary principles through plainly rational means. Thus, a painting that adhered to neoplastic theory would typically consist of only simple shapes and primary colors.

Origin 
The term "plastic arts" has been used historically to denote visual art forms (painting, sculpture, and ceramics) as opposed to literature or music. The terms plasticity and plasticism became more widely used in the early 20th century by critics discussing modern painting, particularly the works of Paul Cézanne.

Assumptions  

According to the neoplasticists, the painter, sculptor, architect, musician, writer, etc., are concerned with expressing or depicting all facets of life. However, this never happens by chance. Every painting, sculpture, building, piece of music, book, etc., is deliberately created. It is the maker's product and, to a lesser extent, what it represents. The events in this painting by Nicolas Poussin never took place. Even the body postures of the figures are not so common in real life. Yet it convinces and forms a harmonious whole. So every artist manipulates reality to produce an aesthetically pleasing, artfully pleasing whole: to create harmony. Even the most realistic painters, such as Johannes Vermeer or Rembrandt van Rijn, used all kinds of artistic means to achieve the greatest possible degree of harmony. The artists of De Stijl called these visual means. However, the artist determines to what extent he allows these visual means to dominate or to stay as close as possible to his subject. In painting and sculpture, and to a lesser extent in architecture, music, and literature, there is a duality between the idea of the artist and the matter of the world around us.

Bibliography 
Bax, Marty (2001) Mondriaan compleet, Alphen aan den Rijn: Atrium, .
Bock, Manfred, Vincent van Rossem en Kees Somer (2001) Cornelis van Eesteren, architect, urbanist [deel 1], Rotterdam: NAi Publishers, Den Haag: EFL Stichting, .
Bonset, I.K. (July 1922) ‘Beeldende verskunst en hare verhouding tot de andere kunsten’, De Stijl, vol. 5, no. 6, pp. 88–89.
Doesburg, Theo van (October 1917) ‘Ter inleiding’, De Stijl, vol. 1, no. 1, pp. 1–2.
Doesburg, Theo van (November 1918) ‘Aanteekeningen over monumentale kunst’, De Stijl, vol. 2, no. 1, pp. 10–12.
Doesburg, Theo van (1919) Drie voordrachten over de nieuwe beeldende kunst, Amsterdam: Maatschappij voor goede en goedkoope lectuur.
Doesburg, Theo van (March 1920) ‘Aanteekeningen bij de Bijlagen VI en VII’, De Stijl, vol. 3, no. 5, pp. 44–46.
Doesburg, Theo van (February 1922) ‘Der Wille zum Stil (Neugestaltung von Leben, Kunst und Technik)’, De Stijl, vol. 5, no. 2, pp. 23–32.
Doesburg, Theo van (March 1922) 'Von den neuen Ästhetik zur materiellen Verwirklichung', De Stijl, vol. 6, no. 1, pp. 10–14.
Horst Richter. Geschichte der Malerei im 20. Jahrhundert. Köln. 1988
Engel, Henk (2009) "Theo van Doesburg & the destruction of architectural theory", in: Gladys Fabre en Doris Wintgens Hötte (red.), Van Doesburg & the international avant-garde. Constructing a new world, [London]: Tate Publishing, pp. 36–45.
Fabre, Gladys (2009) "A universal language for the arts: interdisciplinarity as a practice, film as a model", in: Gladys Fabre en Doris Wintgens Hötte (red.), Van Doesburg & the international avant-garde. Constructing a new world, [London]: Tate Publishing, pp. 46–57.
Frampton, Kenneth (1982) "Neoplasticisme en architectuur: formatie en transformatie", in Mildred Friedman (red.) De Stijl: 1917-1931, Amsterdam: Meulenhoff/Landshoff, .
Huszàr, Vilmos (March 1918) ‘Aesthetische beschouwingen III (bij bijlagen 9 en 10)’, De Stijl, vol. 1, no. 5, pp. 54–57. See Digital Dada Archive.
Jaffé, H.L.C. (1983) Theo van Doesburg, [Amsterdam]: Meulenhoff/Landshoff, .
Overy, Paul ([1991] 2000) De Stijl, London: Thames and Hudson, .
Mondriaan, Piet (oktober 1917) ‘De nieuwe beelding in de schilderkunst. 1. Inleiding’, De Stijl, vol. 1, no. 1, pp. 2–6.

References

De Stijl
Art movements in Europe